John David Blake Butler (22 October 1924 – 15 April 1981) was an English actor best known for his role as the lecherous chief librarian Mr. Wainwright during the first and third series of Last of the Summer Wine in 1973 and 1976 respectively.

Background
Butler was the second son of FitzWalter Butler (1889–1979), of Grantham, Lincolnshire, and Doris Emma (d. 1950), daughter of Robert Pollok, of Cavendish Park, Barrow-in-Furness. The Butler family were Irish landed gentry; Blake Butler's line, prominent in County Clare, descended from James Butler, 10th Baron Dunboyne.

Career
In addition to his work on Last of the Summer Wine, Butler made guest appearances on such programmes as Dad's Army, Doctor at Large, Bless This House, The Good Life, Paul Temple, George and Mildred, Grange Hill and, in 1967, Crossroads playing assistant manager Maurice Raine.

Filmography 

1978 'Rumpole of the Bailey' 'Rumpole and the Heavy Brigade' – Mr Thistleton

Personal life
Butler lived at 33, Bath Road, Bedford Park, London W.4.

References

External links
 

1924 births
1981 deaths
People from Barrow-in-Furness
English male television actors
20th-century English male actors
Male actors from Lancashire